Giacomo Grimaldi (November 1568 – 7 January 1623) was an Italian historian and Vatican archivist, who lived in the early 17th century.

Biography 
His principal surviving works deal with the Roman Catholic Church. Several papal tombs in old St. Peter's Basilica, that were destroyed during the rebuilding, are only known through illustrations by Grimaldi, who was the basilica’s notary. He is also notable for saving Pope Urban VI's remains from being discarded in 1606 and his sarcophagus used for a water trough.

Many of his drawings were copied and published by Giovanni Giustino Ciampini in his book "De sacris aedificiis a Constantino Magno constructis", published in 1693.

Gallery

References

External links 

 

17th-century Italian historians
Italian archivists
17th-century Roman Catholics
1568 births
1623 deaths